Trouser Jazz is an electronic album by Mr. Scruff, released in 2002. It is Mr. Scruff's second "proper" album (actually his third, but the early compilation album Mr. Scruff was deleted and re-released in 2005). In 2010 it was awarded a gold certification from the Independent Music Companies Association, which indicated sales of at least 100,000 copies throughout Europe.

Track listing

CD
"Here We Go"  – 1:11
"Sweet Smoke"  – 6:36
"Beyond" (featuring Seaming To)  – 3:48
"Shrimp" (featuring Sneaky of Fingathing)  – 7:01
"Come Alive" (featuring Niko)  – 5:15
"Shelf Wobbler"  – 6:31
"Giffin"  – 5:56
"Valley of the Sausages" (featuring Moss, Sneaky & Seaming To)  – 5:00
"Champion Nibble"  – 3:34
"Come On Grandad"  – 5:47
"Vibrate" (featuring Braintax)  – 3:09
"Ug"  – 4:37
"Ahoy There!" (featuring Albert Ross) [not on digital]  – 4:24

LP

Side one
"Here We Go"
"Shelf Wobbler"

Side two
"Sweet Smoke"
"Champion Nibble"

Side three
"Shrimp"
"Beyond"

Side four
"Valley of the Sausages"
"Come On Grandad"

Side five
"Giffin"
"Come Alive"

Side six
"Vibrate"
"Ug"
"Ahoy There!"

References

Mr. Scruff albums
2002 albums
Ninja Tune albums